Békéscsabai RSE, is a Hungarian women's volleyball club based in Békéscsaba. The won the Hungarian Championships five times in a row from 2014 to 2018.

Honours

National competitions
 NB I: 5
2014, 2015, 2016, 2017, 2018

 Hungarian Cup: 2
2016, 2017

Team

Current squad 
 1  Ksenija Ivanović  
 2  Renáta Szpin  
 3  Nikoleta Perović
 4  Fanny Fábián  
 5  Sofija Medić
 6  Zóra Glemboczki  
 7  Zsuzsanna Tálas
 8  Eszter Anna Pekárik  
 9  Lucija Mlinar
 10  Dorottya  Bodnár  
 11  Réka Szedmák  
 12  Flóra Sebestyén  
 13  Rita Molcsányi  
 14  Tatjana Bokan
 15  Hanna Bodovics

External links 
CEV profile 

Hungarian volleyball clubs